Eagle Mount  is a 501(c)(3) non-profit organization that facilitates and implements therapeutic recreational programs and opportunities for people with disabilities, children with cancer, and provides support for their families. The organization was founded in Bozeman, Montana, and additional independent Eagle Mount organizations currently exist in Billings, Montana, and Great Falls, Montana. The information in this article refers to Eagle Mount Bozeman.

History 
The I Am Third Foundation (based on Matthew 22) and Eagle Mount were founded in 1982 by General Robert C. Mathis and his wife, Greta, retired from a 34-year career in the Air Force. According to the Bozeman Daily Chronicle, “The couple created more than a program for people with disabilities. They created kinship between anyone who deigns to get involved".

They started in the fall of 1983 with the Eagle Mount ski program at the Bridger Bowl ski hill. The following summer, they added horseback riding at a local ranch. The next programs to be added were swimming and the Big Sky Kids camps for children with cancer.

Eagle Mount Bozeman's campus in currently 19 acres which was donated by a local family; ten acres in the mid-1980s and an additional 9 adjacent acres in 2010. The campus includes administrative offices; riding arena with barn and horse paddocks; the Tim and Mary Barnard Aquatic Therapy Center built in 2008; and the gardens and grounds.

Programs Offered 
Eagle Mount started with skiing in 1983. Other programs include adaptive horsemanship, aquatic therapy and adaptive swimming, Big Sky Kids oncology camps, horticultural therapy, the EMBLEM program for veterans, and parent support programs.

Eagle Mount does alpine skiing and snowboarding at Bridger Bowl and Big Sky Resort, and Nordic skiing and snowshoeing at Bohart Ranch. Other programs are hosted on the Eagle Mount campus.

Number of Participants 
While the anticipated need in the small town of Bozeman, Montana in the fall of 1982 was around twenty participants, nearly 100 people with disabilities signed up for the first winter of skiing. In 2014, 1,783 participants were assisted by 1,979 volunteers who spent over 30,000 hours with Eagle Mount Bozeman's programs.

Fundraising 
Eagle Mount is a private non-profit organization which does not take government funding, instead relying on private donors, grants, and foundations. In-kind donations such as program equipment, ski passes and rental services, horses and hay, and more also facilitate the variety of programs. Support has come from The M.J. Murdock Charitable Trust and the Dennis and Phyllis Washington Foundation. Three annual events are held in support of Eagle Mount Bozeman's programs including the Western Rendezvous, a barn dance and auction fundraiser; the Crystal Ball, a black-tie event; and Digger Days, a collaboration with local construction companies to let people of all ages drive heavy equipment with the support of professional operators.

Adaptive Equipment 
Eagle Mount serves a wide variety of people with disabilities through a combination of specially trained staff and specialized equipment. The equipment includes mono-skis and bi-skis. These skis either have one or two skis under a specialized seat; a trained volunteer then holds a tether or bar, helping glide the person down the hill. Other specialized equipment includes 'ski legs' for skiers who can stand but need additional support on the hill and handcycles for cyclists with lower body impairments such as a spinal cord injury or amputation.

References

Bozeman, Montana
Non-profit organizations based in Montana
1982 establishments in Montana